Flight 100 may refer to flights in the following incidents:

 Swissair flight from Zürich to New York, in the 1970 Dawson's Field hijackings
 Asian Spirit Flight 100, crashed into a mountain in the Philippines in 1999

0100